The Lipscomb County Courthouse, on Courthouse Square in Lipscomb, Texas, was built in 1916.  It was listed on the National Register of Historic Places in 2008.  It serves Lipscomb County, which was created/organized in 1886/1887.  It is a Texas State Antiquities Landmark and a Recorded Texas Historic Landmark.

It was deemed notable asthe most prominent historic building in one of the least-populated counties in the state of Texas. The courthouse is the focal point of the unincorporated town of Lipscomb, with a population of less than 50, and it serves as both the governmental and social center for the county's residents. Classical Revival in style, the building epitomizes the period aesthetic applied to a small county courthouse. Designed by architect and general contractor W. M. Rice of Amarillo, this building of buff-colored brick is nominated to the National Register of Historic Places under Criterion A in the area of Government, and Criterion C in the area of Architecture, both at the local level of significance.

The listing includes a second contributing building.

See also

National Register of Historic Places listings in Lipscomb County, Texas
Recorded Texas Historic Landmarks in Lipscomb County
List of county courthouses in Texas

References

External links

Courthouses in Texas
Courthouses on the National Register of Historic Places in Texas
National Register of Historic Places in Lipscomb County, Texas
Neoclassical architecture in Texas
Government buildings completed in 1916